Spring Bluff can refer to:

Places
Australia
Spring Bluff, Queensland, locality in the Toowoomba Region
United States
Spring Bluff, Georgia, unincorporated community
Spring Bluff, Missouri, unincorporated community
Springbluff, Wisconsin, ghost town